Eutelsat 3D is a communications satellite operated by Eutelsat which will provide services to Europe, North Africa, the Middle East and Central Asia. It will initially be located at 3° E in geosynchronous orbit in a fixed point above the equator, where Eutelsat already has two satellites Eutelsat 3A and Eutelsat 3C. Once Eutelsat 3B is launched in 2014 this satellite will be moved to 7°E.

The satellite has four footprints and broadcasts on both Ka band and Ku band. Three footprints will serve Europe, the Middle East, Central Asia and North Africa in both Ka and Ku bands. The fourth footprint will cover sub-Saharan Africa but only in Ku band. It will have 56 transponders in total. The satellite was built by Thales Alenia Space using their spacebus 4000 satellite bus.

The satellite will be launched by International Launch Services from pad 39 at Site 200 at Baikonur Cosmodrome in Kazakhstan. The launch will use a Proton-M rocket with a Briz-M upper stage. The first three stages of the Proton fire for the first 9 minutes, 42 seconds. After that the Briz-M upper stage takes over with five separate burns until the space craft separates from the upper stage 9 hours and 13 minutes after launch.

The satellite launched on 14 May 2013 at 16:02 UTC and was successfully placed into geostationary transfer orbit. It was given the International Designator 2013-022A and the US satellite catalog reference 39163.

Eutelsat name their satellites after their locations so it is likely that this satellite will change name when it is moved. Eutelsat 3C used to be called Atlantic Bird 4A when it was located at 7°W. It was renamed to 3C when it moved to 3°E. Eutelsat 3A was likewise renamed when it moved.

References

External links

Eutelsat 7B Footprints on Google Maps.
Eutelsat 7B Footprints as images.

Spacecraft launched in 2013
Communications satellites in geostationary orbit
Spacecraft launched by Proton rockets
Satellites using the Spacebus bus
Eutelsat satellites